HD 86226 is a G-type yellowish white star found in the constellation of Hydra.

A survey in 2015 has ruled out the existence of any stellar companions at projected distances above 12 astronomical units.

Radio emission at a frequency of 150 MHz has been tentatively detected from the proximity of this system, although it is not clear whether the star or a satellite orbiting a rapidly rotating planet is the source.

Planetary system
Due to the periodic spectrum shifts when it had when placed under a Doppler test, 13 Magellan Doppler Velocity observations were made of an object found near the star. The object discovered in 2010 had a Keplerian orbit, was declared an exoplanet and dubbed HD 86226 b.

A hot Super-Earth planet called HD 86226 c was also discovered in 2020. It may be undergoing considerable atmospheric mass loss.

See also 
 HD 129445
 HD 152079
 HD 164604
 HD 175167
 List of extrasolar planets

References

External links

G-type main-sequence stars
Planetary systems with one confirmed planet
Hydra (constellation)
CD-23 08866
086226
048739